= Brown coat =

Brown coat may refer to:

- the brown coat, a layer (typically the second of three) of stucco
- Browncoat, a fan of the American space western science fiction drama television series Firefly, which aired 11 episodes in 2002
